Peter John Graves (born 19 May 1946) is a former English first-class cricketer. He represented Sussex and Orange Free State as a batsman. He served as vice-captain under Tony Greig at Sussex and later coached at the club.

External links
 
 

1946 births
Living people
English cricketers
Place of birth missing (living people)
Free State cricketers
Sussex cricketers